Harold Whetstone Johnston (March 18, 1859 in Rushville, Illinois – June 17, 1912) was a classical historian and Professor of Latin at Indiana University, best known for writing The Private Life of the Romans.

Personal life
Johnston was the son of DeWitt Clinton Johnston and Margretta Hay (Bower). In 1882, he married Eugenia Hinrichsen.

Death
Johnston died of cyanide poisoning on June 17, 1912 while on a train from Monon, Indiana to Indianapolis. The coroner determined that he had ingested potassium cyanide intentionally, and his friends indicated he had been upset due to financial difficulties.

Works
 1897 – A collection of examples illustrating the metrical licenses of vergil
 1903 – The Private Life of the Romans, Publisher: Beaufort Books (1972 reissue) 
 1910 – Selected Orations and Letters of Cicero Scott, Foresman and Co.

References

External links
 
 
 

1859 births
1912 deaths
American classical scholars
American Latinists
Suicides by cyanide poisoning
1912 suicides
Suicides in Indiana